The Anderson Z is an early 1930s American-designed single-engine biplane.

Development
The Model Z was designed and built by a self-taught "Flying Farmer", Andrew A. Anderson of Hawley, Minnesota and Rollag, Minnesota. It is of typical biplane layout, with the upper wing supported by cabane struts from the forward fuselage, and these also house the air-cooled radiator. The tailplane is high-set on the rear fuselage and the two seats are housed in separate open cockpits. The undercarriage is fixed and unsprung.

Operational history
The aircraft was flown by Anderson during the early 1930s, but was retired before World War II. It was discovered in a dismantled state in 1977 and was acquired by the Antique Airplane Association (AAA) who restored it for display. It is now (2009) owned by the Airpower Museum based at the Antique Airfield near Blakesburg, Iowa. It last taxied under its own power during the 1994 AAA fly-in.

Specifications

Notes

References
Bibliography

External links
Specifications and image at Aerofiles

1930s United States civil utility aircraft
Biplanes
Single-engined tractor aircraft
Aircraft first flown in 1932